Robert C. Kirkwood (August 30, 1909 – May 5, 1964) served as a member of the California State Assembly representing part of Santa Clara County from 1947 until 1953, when he resigned to accept an appointment as California State Controller by Governor Earl Warren. Kirkwood was elected to a full term in 1954, but lost a re-election bid in 1958 to Alan Cranston, who later became a United States senator.

Born in Mountain View, California, Kirkwood married Jean Hazard Gerlinger on August 30, 1933. They went on to have four children—two daughters and two sons.

In 1959, Kirkwood was appointed Utilities General Manager of the San Francisco Water Department. He died in San Francisco in 1964. The Water Department named a hydroelectric plant in Alpine County after Kirkwood, and the plant came online in 1967. Also, the Robert C Kirkwood Entrance At Castle Rock State Park opened in August 2019.

Kirkwood's son, Bob Kirkwood, was appointed by Governor Arnold Schwarzenegger to the Sierra Nevada Conservancy in 2005.

References

External links
Robert Kirkwood Political History

1909 births
1964 deaths
State Controllers of California
Republican Party members of the California State Assembly
People from Santa Clara County, California
20th-century American politicians
People from Mountain View, California